Igor Đaletić (Montenegrin Cyrillic: Игор Ђалетић; born 27 September 1971) is a Montenegrin professional basketball coach and former player. He currently serves as an assistant coach for Alvark Tokyo of the B.League.

Coaching career 
Đaletić started in season 2010-11 as a women's head coach for Budućnost Podgorica (Montenegro).
In season 2011 Đaletić was named as assistant coach for man basketball team Budućnost Voli, ABA League where he stayed till season 2017–18.
In 2015-16 and 2016-17 he was appointed as the head coach of Budućnost Voli and he won two Montenegrin League titles.
After resigning at Budućnost Voli in July 2018, Đaletić signed as assistant coach for team Basket Zielona Góra(Poland) for 2018–19 season.
In season 2019-20 Đaletić assigned for Alvark Tokyo(Japan) as assistant coach. The team won the FIBA Asia Champions Cup title the same season.

National team coaching career 
In 2013 Đaletić was named an assistant coach of Montenegro women's national team for EuroBasket Women 2015 qualification, where they took 2nd place in the group. 
Đaletić was an assistant coach on EuroBasket Women 2015 where they finished on 7th place.

Career achievements and awards 
As player
1995-96 Yugoslav Cup winner (with Budućnost)
2002-03 Liga Portuguesa de Basquetebol All-star Game
2003-04 Romanian League champion (with CSU Asesoft Ploieşti)
2003-04 Romanian Cup winner (with CSU Asesoft Ploieşti)

As head coach
2015-16 Montenegrin League champion (with Budućnost)
2016-17 Montenegrin League champion (with Budućnost)

As assistant coach
2011-12 EuroCup quarterfinals, ABA League Final four, Montenegrin League champion and Montenegrin Cup winner (with Budućnost)
2012-13 EuroCup quarterfinals, Montenegrin League champion (with Budućnost)
2013-14 Montenegrin League champion and Montenegrin Cup (with Budućnost)
2014-15 ABA League semifinal, Montenegrin League champion and Montenegrin Cup winner (with Budućnost)
2015-16 ABA League semifinal, Montenegrin Cup winner (with Budućnost)
2016-17 ABA League semifinal, Montenegrin Cup winner (with Budućnost)
2017-18 ABA League champion, EuroCup quarterfinals, Montenegrin Cup winner (with Budućnost)
2019-20 FIBA Asia Champions Cup champion (with Alvark Tokyo)

References

External links
Player profile at eurobasket.com
Coach profile at eurobasket.com
Coach profile at fibaeurope.com
Coach profile at aba-liga.com

1971 births
Living people
Sportspeople from Podgorica
Alvark Tokyo coaches
KK Budućnost coaches
Montenegrin basketball coaches
Montenegrin expatriate basketball people in Japan
Montenegrin expatriate basketball people in Poland
Montenegrin expatriate basketball people in Serbia
Montenegrin expatriate basketball people in Portugal
Yugoslav men's basketball players
Montenegrin men's basketball players
KK Budućnost players
KK Crvena zvezda players
KK Lovćen players
KK Borac Čačak players
KK Iva Zorka Šabac players
KK Zdravlje players
KK Igokea players
KK Napredak Kruševac players
KK Sutjeska players
C.A. Queluz players